is a Japanese animated television series. The episodes are directed by Akira Nishimori and produced by the Japanese animation studio XEBEC M2 and Genco. They are based on the Hitohira manga by Izumi Kirihara, and adapt the source material over twelve episodes. The episodes aired from March 28, 2007 to June 13, 2007 on AT-X, Chiba TV, Sun TV, TV Aichi, TV Kanagawa and TV Saitama.

Two pieces of theme music are used for the episodes: one opening theme and one ending theme.

Six DVD compilations, each containing two episodes of the series, have been released by Media Factory. The first was released on June 22, 2007, and the sixth on November 22, 2007.

Episode list

References

External links
Official anime website 
Official blog for the anime 

Hitohira